Yusefabad Cham Chal (also Romanized as Yūsefābād Cham Chāl; also known as Yūsefābād) is a village in Mirbag-e Jonubi Rural District, in the Central District of Delfan County, Lorestan Province, Iran. At the 2006 census, its population was 128, in 27 families.

References 

Towns and villages in Delfan County